James Louis Beattie (born July 4, 1954) is an American former professional baseball pitcher who played for the New York Yankees and Seattle Mariners from 1978 to 1986. Beattie retired from his decades-long career in the MLB at the end of the 2018 season. Beattie starred in baseball and basketball at South Portland High School in South Portland, Maine.

Amateur career
In 1974, he played collegiate summer baseball with the Harwich Mariners of the Cape Cod Baseball League and was named a league all-star.

Professional career

New York Yankees
Beattie was drafted by the New York Yankees in the fourth round (91st overall) of the 1975 Major League Baseball draft, and was soon tabbed one of the top pitching prospects in the Yankees' farm system, along with Ken Clay and Gil Patterson. Each vocalized frustration with the organization when they acquired pitchers Rich Gossage, Andy Messersmith and Rawly Eastwick after the  season believing that it hindered their chances of making the major league roster that Spring.

He pitched  innings and gave up just one run in his major league debut to beat Hall of Famer Jim Palmer and the Baltimore Orioles. After a second win against the Chicago White Sox on May 15, Beattie lost his next seven decisions in a row. He was, however, on the mound for two of the Yankees' most important games that September. With the Yankees having been as far back as fourteen games to the Boston Red Sox on July 19, they surged to just four games back by the time they headed to Fenway Park for a four-game set from September 7–10. Beattie started the second game of the series, holding Boston to just three hits and no runs over his first eight innings of work. After the Red Sox scored two unearned runs in the ninth, he handed the ball over to Ron Davis for the final out. The Yankees swept the series to move into a tie with Boston. They moved on to Detroit for a three-game set next, and Beattie won the second game of that series to give the Yankees sole possession of first place. He finished his rookie season with a 6–9 record and a 3.73 earned run average (ERA) in 25 games (22 starts).

Following a one-game playoff with the Red Sox, the Yankees headed into the postseason. Beattie won Game 1 of the 1978 American League Championship Series against the Kansas City Royals, and earned a complete game victory over the Los Angeles Dodgers in Game 5 of the World Series.

Despite his late season and postseason heroics, Beattie failed to make the club the following spring. He was, however, called up by the beginning of May. On June 20, a line drive off the bat of the Toronto Blue Jays' John Mayberry shelved Beattie for two months. On September 12, Boston Red Sox legend Carl Yastrzemski singled off Beattie for his 3,000th career hit. After the season, he, Rick Anderson, Juan Beníquez and Jerry Narron were traded to the Seattle Mariners for Ruppert Jones and Jim Lewis.

Seattle Mariners
Despite posting a 5.01 ERA, Beattie's record stood at 3–3 on May 21,  following a victory over the Milwaukee Brewers. He only won two more games for the rest of the season, and finished at 5–15 with a 4.85 ERA in 33 games (29 starts). Beattie started the  season in the bullpen, but after getting rocked in three outings, he was reassigned to the Triple-A Pacific Coast League Spokane Indians. He returned to the majors after the 1981 Major League Baseball strike, and pitch an eight inning gem against the California Angels on August 11 for his first victory of the season. Beattie went 3–2 with one save with a 2.02 ERA while holding batters to a .212 batting average in the second half, as opposed to the eight earned runs he gave up in  innings of work prior to his demotion to Spokane. His one and only career save came during a wild 20-inning game on September 3, 1981. The Mariners defeated the Red Sox at Fenway Park 8–7 in a 20-inning game. Beattie recorded the final out of the game to nail down the victory. His success carried over into the  season. Despite an 8–12 record, his 3.34 ERA was seventh-best in the American League, 140 strikeouts was eighth-best, and the .233 batting average he held batters to was sixth-best.

On September 27, Beattie hurled the first one-hitter in Seattle Mariners history against the Kansas City Royals. Outside of a U.L. Washington single in the third inning, Beattie was perfect. Perhaps the second-best pitching performance of his career came in a losing effort. On July 25, he and the California Angels' Ron Romanick locked up in a pitchers' duel. Beattie pitched nine innings of one-hit ball while striking out nine. With the game still scoreless heading into extra innings, Beattie took the mound again in the tenth inning, where Gary Pettis ended it with a two-out walk-off single. After the game, Beattie smashed a water cooler and refused to talk to reporters.

Beattie began dealing with shoulder tendinitis late in his career. He missed six weeks of the  season with tendinitis, then tore his rotator cuff upon his return.

Beattie returned from surgery midway through the  season. He pitched effectively in his first start against the Chicago White Sox on June 12, and was in line for the victory until the bullpen imploded. From there, Beattie himself imploded as he went 0–6 with a 6.02 ERA in nine games (seven starts) through August 7, when he was placed back on the disabled list.

Post-playing career
Rather than trying to catch on with another big league club after being released by the Mariners, Beattie opted to go back to school. Beattie remained in that position through the 1995 season, when he was named general manager and vice president of the Montreal Expos. He quit at the end of the  season; after a year away from the game, he joined the Baltimore Orioles as executive vice president of baseball operations. He served as co-GM of the Orioles with former Orioles pitcher Mike Flanagan through the  season, when Flanagan was given the job solely. When Boston Red Sox GM Theo Epstein threatened to leave the Red Sox shortly afterwards, Beattie interviewed for the job.

In something of an unexpected career turn, Beattie finished the 2007 season as the Florida Marlins' bullpen coach. After former bullpen coach Steve Foster became Florida's pitching coach following Rick Kranitz's departure, Beattie jokingly offered his services to Marlins GM Larry Beinfest, and Beinfest took him up on his offer. Beattie was also rumored to be a candidate for the Marlins' pitching coach position in 2008, but the job instead went to Mark Wiley.

Sources

External links
, or Baseball Almanac

1954 births
Living people
American expatriate baseball players in Canada
Baltimore Orioles executives
Baseball coaches from Maine
Baseball players from Maine
Baseball coaches from Virginia
Baseball players from Virginia
Calgary Cannons players
Columbus Clippers players
Fort Lauderdale Yankees players
Harwich Mariners players
Major League Baseball general managers
Major League Baseball pitchers
Montreal Expos executives
New York Yankees players
Oneonta Yankees players
Sportspeople from South Portland, Maine
Salt Lake City Gulls players
Seattle Mariners players
South Portland High School alumni
Spokane Indians players
Sportspeople from Hampton, Virginia
Syracuse Chiefs players
Tacoma Yankees players
Toronto Blue Jays scouts
West Haven Yankees players